The 2015 season of the 3. divisjon, the fourth highest association football league for men in Norway.

Between 22 and 26 games (depending on group size) are played in 12 groups, with 3 points given for wins and 1 for draws. Twelve group winners are promoted to the 2. divisjon.

Tables 

Group 1
Oppsal – promoted
Kråkerøy
Follo 2
Sarpsborg 08 2
Trosvik
Grorud 2
Østsiden
Drøbak/Frogn
Fredrikstad 2
Ås
Skeid 2
Borgar – relegated
Nesodden – relegated
Selbak – relegated

Group 2
Asker – promoted
Funnefoss/Vormsund
Skedsmo
Hauerseter
Skjetten
Strømmen 2
Lokomotiv Oslo
Ottestad
Kongsvinger 2
Ham-Kam 2
Ull/Kisa IL 2
Gjerdrum – relegated
Rælingen – relegated
Grue – relegated

Group 3
Frigg – promoted
Røa
Ready
Korsvoll
Valdres
Grei
Hallingdal
Jevnaker
Nordstrand
Hasle-Løren
Oslo City
Oldenborg – relegated
Skårer – relegated
Lyn 2 – relegated

Group 4
Tønsberg – promoted
Lommedalen
Sandefjord 2
Mjøndalen 2
Vestfossen
Strømsgodset 3
Åssiden
Bærum 2
Larvik Turn – pulled team
Eik-Tønsberg
Skarphedin
Modum – relegated
Fagerborg – relegated
Birkebeineren – relegated

Group 5
Pors – promoted
Frøyland
Ålgård
Start 2
Sandnes Ulf 2
Randesund
Bryne 2
Mandalskameratene
Vigør
Odd 3
Express
Tollnes – relegated
Lyngdal – relegated
Hei – relegated

Group 6
Stord – promoted
Haugesund 2
Viking 2
Os
Riska
Åkra
Vardeneset
Randaberg
Staal
Vard 2
Brodd
Madla
Vaulen – relegated
Kopervik – relegated

Group 7
Lysekloster – promoted
Sotra
Varegg
Brann 2
Øystese
Lyngbø
Austevoll
Arna-Bjørnar
Bjarg
Tertnes
Nest-Sotra 2
Vadmyra – relegated
Loddefjord – relegated
Fyllingsdalen 2 – relegated

Group 8
Brattvåg – promoted
Kristiansund FK
Herd
Sogndal 2
Spjelkavik
Stryn
Volda
Årdal
Hødd 2
Bergsøy
Florø 2
Kristiansund 2 – relegated
Eid – relegated
Skarbøvik – relegated

Group 9
Tynset – promoted
Orkla
Lillehammer
Flisa
KIL/Hemne
Ranheim 2
Raufoss 2
Faaberg
Buvik
Gjøvik-Lyn 2
Alvdal
Kolbu/KK – relegated
Moelven – relegated
Kvik – relegated

Group 10
Rosenborg 2 – promoted
Kolstad
Steinkjer
Verdal
Sverresborg
NTNUI
Charlottenlund
Byåsen 2
Strindheim 2
Heimdal
Namsos
Neset – relegated
Nardo – relegated
Åfjord – relegated

Group 11
Mo – promoted
Bodø/Glimt 2
Stålkameratene
Melbo
Sandnessjøen
Sortland
Junkeren
Mosjøen
Fauske/Sprint
Medkila
Grand Bodø – relegated
Tverlandet – relegated

Group 12
Tromsø 2 – promoted
Kirkenes
Fløya
Skarp
Bjørnevatn
Skjervøy
Ishavsbyen
Alta 2
Hammerfest
Salangen
Bossekop – relegated
Porsanger – relegated

References
NIFS

Norwegian Third Division seasons
4
Norway
Norway